Suttle, also known as Felix, is an unincorporated community in Perry County, Alabama, United States.

History
Suttle is named for the family of James F. Suttle, who served as the postmaster in 1933. A post office operated under the name Felix from 1880 to 1933 and under the name Suttle from 1933 to 1973. James Suttle, who served on the Alabama Highway Commission as the Commissioner of Maintenance in 1923, operated a general store, cotton gin, and cotton farm in Suttle. He also operated a large dairy farm.

Notable person
David V. Jemison, father of T. J. Jemison. Served as President of the National Baptist Convention, USA, Inc. from 1940 to 1953. Preached at Bethany Church in Suttle from 1901 to 1903.

References

External links
 SHP historical survey of Suttle, including pictures of remaining structures

Unincorporated communities in Perry County, Alabama
Unincorporated communities in Alabama